The broad skate (Amblyraja badia) is a poorly known species of skate in the family Rajidae. It is sporadically distributed in the Pacific Ocean, from the Gulf of Panama to British Columbia and the Bering Sea, to the Tohoku Slope off northern Honshu and the Okhotsk Slope off Hokkaido. The species name, badia, comes from the Latin  meaning "brown", referring to its color.

The pectoral fin disc of the broad skate is wider than it is long, with sharply rounded apices. The snout is short and blunt, with several enlarged thornlets at the tip. Its underside is smooth and its dorsal surface is densely covered with prickles. Two or three pairs of distinctive scapular thorns are on each shoulder, usually arranged in a triangle, and a row of 24-29 median thorns along the back, flanked by a row of smaller lateral thornlets on the tail. The tail is relatively short and tapering, with two similar-sized dorsal fins and no interdorsal thorn. The very small caudal fin is placed close behind the second dorsal fin. The coloration is chocolate-brown to gray-brown above with scattered darker spots, same below except for the pelvic fin lobes and tail, which are darker. Whitish areas are on the snout, upper abdomen, nostrils, mouth, gill slits, and anal opening.

Broad skates feed on cephalopods, crustaceans, and small bony fishes such as rattails. They are presumably oviparous like other skate species. The smallest known free-swimming specimens measured . This species is of no commercial interest, but is occasionally taken as bycatch in deepwater trawls and traps.

References

External links
 Species Description of Amblyraja badia at www.shark-references.com

Amblyraja
Taxa named by Samuel Garman
Fish described in 1899